is a bus line in Niigata, Niigata Prefecture, Japan. It is operated by Niigata Kotsu, and called BRT.

List of stops

As of April 2018, the following stops are available.

 ● Stops at this stop
 | Does not stop at this stop

References

External links
 Timetables and Maps (2018.3-) - Niigata Kotsu 

Niigata (city)
Transport in Niigata Prefecture
Bus rapid transit in Japan